Tirana Observer is an Albanian language newspaper published in Tirana, Albania. Tirana Observer is a politically unaffiliated daily newspaper.

Content

Sections
The newspaper is organised in three sections, including the magazine.
News: Includes International, National, Tirana, Politics, Business, Technology, Science, Health, Sports, Education.
Opinion: Includes Editorials, Op-Eds and Letters to the Editor.
Features: Includes Arts, Movies, Theatre, and Sport.

Web presence
Tirana Observer has had a web presence since 2007. Accessing articles requires no registration.

Pricing
The paper's price is 30 Leke and could by bought by local shops. The newspaper is for subscribers available in Albania.

References

Newspapers published in Albania
Mass media in Tirana